Küçükçekmece SK is a sports club of Istanbul, Turkey.

History

Küçükçekmece SK was founded by Hikmet Barlan under the name Süleymaniye Terbiye-i Bedeniye Kulübü in 1911.
The first colors were navy blue-orange.  Later they changed it to black and white.
In 1990, the club moved from Eminönü to the Küçükçekmece district and changed its name to Küçükçekmece SK and the colors to green and white.

Honours
Istanbul Football League:
Runners-Up: 1931–1932

See also
List of Turkish Sports Clubs by Foundation Dates

References
 Süleymaniye Terbiye-i Bedeniye Kulübü. Türk Futbol Tarihi vol.1. page(24). (June 1992) Türkiye Futbol Federasyonu Yayınları.

External links
Küçükçekmecespor on TFF.org

Association football clubs established in 1911
Sport in Istanbul
Football clubs in Istanbul
1911 establishments in the Ottoman Empire